Dactylosporina is a genus of fungi in the family Physalacriaceae. D. brunneomarginata, the first representative of the genus found in Asia, was added to Dactylosporina in 2015.

References

Physalacriaceae